Microlasma fragile is a species of symmetrical sessile barnacle in the family Pachylasmatidae.

References

External links

 

Sessilia

Crustaceans described in 2000